Stephen Masato Wasira (born 1945)  is a Tanzanian CCM politician and Member of Parliament for Bunda constituency since 2005. He was the Minister of State in the President's Office for Social Relations and Coordination since 2010.

Background
Wasira served as Deputy Minister of Agriculture in the first phase Government under President Julius Nyerere and also served as the Deputy Minister for Local Government and later as the Minister of Agriculture and Livestock Development under the second phase President Ali Hassan Mwinyi.

He was appointed as Minister of Water on January 4, 2006, when Jakaya Kikwete, who had been elected President, named his new cabinet. He was then moved to the position of Minister for Agriculture, Food Security and Cooperatives on October 15, 2006, and on February 12, 2008, he was named as the Minister in the Prime Minister's Office for Regional Administration and Local Government.

On November 24, 2010, Wasira was named Minister of State in the President's Office for Social Relations and Coordination in the newly formed cabinet after the October 2010 elections.

Within the ruling Chama cha Mapinduzi, most recently he  was a member of the 370-member National Executive Committee (NEC), the highest policy and decision-making body of the ruling party. He served in this position since 2007. In November 2012, he was overwhelmingly re-elected by the party's National Congress to serve another five-year term.  Also, in 2011, he was elected a member of the party's powerful 28-member Central Committee (CC)  He continued serving as a member of the Central Committee after being re-elected in February 2013 up to December 2017.

Education
BA in Economics & International Studies, American University in Washington, DC, USA.
MA in Economics (Applied Economics), American University in Washington, DC, USA.
Masters in Public Administration, American University in Washington, DC, USA.

References

External links
Official website for Stephen M. Wasira
Statement by Wasira to the 30th Session of IFAD's Governing Council

1945 births
Living people
People from Mara Region
Chama Cha Mapinduzi MPs
Tanzanian MPs 2010–2015
Government ministers of Tanzania
American University alumni
American University School of Public Affairs alumni